The Shelton-Rich Farmstead is a historic farm property in rural Franklin County, Arkansas. The farmhouse is a two-story log structure, finished in weatherboard, with two stone chimneys. The house was built in stages, the earliest of which was c. 1880. The house is one of the oldest surviving buildings in the county.

The property was listed on the National Register of Historic Places in 1989.

See also
National Register of Historic Places listings in Franklin County, Arkansas

References

Houses on the National Register of Historic Places in Arkansas
Houses completed in 1880
Buildings and structures in Franklin County, Arkansas
National Register of Historic Places in Franklin County, Arkansas